Brother, Brother, Brother is the tenth album released by The Isley Brothers on their T-Neck imprint on May 2, 1972. It was to be the Isleys' last studio record with Buddah Records before moving on to Epic in the middle of 1973.

The album's sound encompasses rock, soul and funk. The album featured the top 40 hit, "Pop That Thang", and subsequent hits "Work to Do", "Lay-Away" and their cover of Carole King's "It's Too Late". The brothers also covered two more King songs including the title track and "Sweet Seasons".

The album was remastered and expanded for inclusion in the 2015 released 23CD box set The RCA Victor & T-Neck Album Masters (1959-1983).

Track listing

Personnel
Ronald Isley – lead and background vocals except 9
O'Kelly Isley, Jr. – background vocals, lead vocal on 9
Rudolph Isley – background vocals
Ernie Isley – guitars
Marvin Isley – bass
Chris Jasper – piano, keyboards
Truman Thomas – organ
George Moreland – drums, percussion
Karl Potter – congas

Technical
Michael Delugg – engineer

References

External links 
 The Isley Brothers - Brother, Brother, Brother (1972) album to be listened as stream on Spotify

1972 albums
Buddah Records albums
The Isley Brothers albums
T-Neck Records albums